Zhang Xuejing (张学景, Tianjin, 1935-), stagename Niu Ben (牛犇) is a Chinese film actor.

Biography
He lost both of his parents at the age of six, then lived with his oldest brother, who worked as a driver at the third film factory in Beijing. In 1946, 11-year-old Ben was chosen to act as a village boy "little ox" and became a child star. His stage name Niu Ben is composed of Niu the Chinese character of "牛" (ox, a common surname) and Ben "犇" (three oxen together, a less common personal name). He later played child roles in old Chinese films, and went to Hongkong.

After the foundation of People's Republic of China, he returned to mainland China and became an actor of the Shanghai Film Studio, and one of the members of the 5th China Film Association. In his 60-year career, he has been in hundreds of films and TV plays, and is still active in Chinese film.

Personal Awards
  Golden Rooster Awards  = Best Supporting Actor1983 The Herdsman
  Hundred Flowers Awards = Best Supporting Actor198319971999

Select filmography
 Soul of the Sea (1957)
 The Red Detachment of Women (1961)
 Tink, Tink, the Fountain (1982)
 The Herdsman (1983)
 Chess King (1988)
 To Live (1994)
 Husband Sings, Wife Accompanies (1997)
 Indomitable Daughter in Law (1999)
 The Longest Night in Shanghai (2007)
 Five Minutes to Tomorrow (2014)
 Lovers & Movies (2015)

See also
 Cinema of China

References

External links
 

1935 births
Living people
Male actors from Tianjin
Chinese male child actors
Chinese male film actors
Chinese male television actors
Participants in Chinese reality television series